Johnston is in most cases a habitational surname derived from several places in Scotland. Historically, the surname has been most common throughout Scotland and Ireland.

Etymology
This surname is derived from the genitive case of the given name John and tone or toun ("settlement" in Middle English, literally meaning "John's town".

People with the surname Johnston

A–E
 Alan Johnston (born 1962), BBC correspondent
 Albert Johnston (rugby league) (1891–1961), Australian rugby league footballer
 Albert Sidney Johnston (1803–1862), Texian, American, and Confederate general
 Alexander Johnston (disambiguation), several people
 Andrew Johnston (disambiguation), several people
 Andrew Galbraith Johnston (died 1886), brewer of Oakbank, South Australia
 Anthony Johnston (disambiguation), several people
 Arnrid Johnston (1895-1972), Swedish sculptor and illustrator
 Arthur Johnston (poet) (1587–1641), Scottish physician and poet
 Arthur Johnston (fl. 1877), British bell maker with Gillett & Johnston
 Arthur Johnston (composer) (1898–1954), American composer and songwriter
 Arthur Lawson Johnston, 3rd Baron Luke (born 1933), British peer
 Arthur Johnston (politician) (born 1947), Canadian politician, member of the Legislative Assembly of Alberta
 Ben Johnston (disambiguation)
 Bertie Johnston aka Edward Johnston (politician)
 Bill Johnston (disambiguation)
 Bob Johnston (disambiguation), several people
 Brian Johnston, broadcaster and cricket commentator
 Brian Johnston (rugby league), Australian former professional rugby league footballer and administrator
 Cameron Johnston (American football), Australian-born American football punter
 Charles Johnston (disambiguation), several people, including
 Christina Johnston (born 1987), British operatic soprano
 Clay Johnston (disambiguation), several people, including
 Clay Johnston (academic), American medical academic
 Clay Johnston (American football), American football linebacker
 Clyde M. Johnston, American politician from Wisconsin
 Dale Johnston (curler), Canadian curler
 Daniel Johnston (1961–2019), musician
 Daryl Johnston (born 1966), American football fullback, nicknamed "Moose"
 David Johnston (disambiguation)
 Denis Johnston (1901–1984), Irish playwright
 Dick Johnston (1863–1984), American baseball player
 Donald James Johnston, former Canadian politician and the Secretary General of the OECD
 Edward Johnston (disambiguation), several people, including
 Elmer E. Johnston (1898–1985), American politician

F–L
 Fergus Johnston (born 1959), Irish composer
 Francis Earl Johnston, commander of 1st NZ Infantry Brigade, World War 1
 General Washington Johnston (1776–1833), an American lawyer and politician

 George Johnston (disambiguation), several people, including:
 George Johnston (burgess) (1700–1766), American lawyer and politician
 George Johnston (British Marines officer) (1764–1823), leader of the Rum rebellion
 George Johnston (naturalist) (1797—1855), Scottish surgeon and naturalist
 George Johnston (novelist), Australian journalist and novelist
 George Johnston (politician), Canadian politician
 George Johnston (general), Australian general in World War 1, member of the Fitzroy City Council
 George Johnston (engineer), designer of Scotland's first motorcar, co-founder of Arrol-Johnston Car Company 
 George Johnston (ice hockey), former National Hockey League player
 George Johnston (footballer, born 1947), former Scottish footballer
 George Benson Johnston (1913–2004), Canadian poet
 George Doherty Johnston (1832–1910), American general and politician
 Gerald MacIntosh Johnston, a Canadian Broadway stage actor
 Greg Johnston (rower) (born 1959), former New Zealand rover
 Harold I. Johnston, American Medal of Honor recipient

 Harry Johnston (disambiguation), several people, including:
 Harry Johnston, British explorer and administrator
 Harry Johnston (footballer, born 1919), English international footballer
 Harry Johnston (surveyor), surveyor-general of Western Australia
 Hunter Johnston (born 1980), American professional wrestler, known as Delirious
 Isabel Marion Weir Johnston, pioneering woman student
 Ivan Murray Johnston (1898–1960), American botanist
 James Johnston (disambiguation)
 Jenifer Johnston, Scottish journalist
 Jennifer Johnston (disambiguation)
 Jerry Johnston (born 1959), American clergyman
 Joe Johnston (born 1950), American film director
 John S. Johnston (c.1839–1899), American maritime photographer
 John W. Johnston (1818–1889), American lawyer and politician
 Joseph E. Johnston, American and Confederate general
 Julanne Johnston (1900-1988), American actress
 Julie Johnston (born 1992), maiden name of American soccer player Julie Ertz
 Ken Johnston (journalist), deputy head of media operations at Permanent Joint Headquarters (UK)
 Kristen Johnston, American actress
 Larry Johnston, NHL ice hockey player
 Levi Johnston, American model and entertainer
 Luke Johnston (born 1993), Scottish footballer
 Lynn Johnston, Canadian cartoonist

M–Z
Maria I. Johnston, American author and editor
Mary Johnston, American novelist and women's rights advocate
Matt Johnston, American television and film producer
Max Johnston (disambiguation), several people, including:
Max Johnston (footballer) (born 2003), Scottish footballer
Max Johnston (musician), multi-instrumentalist (Uncle Tupelo, Wilco, the Gourds)
Max Johnston (racing driver) (born 1993), Australian stock car racing driver
Means Johnston Jr. (1916–1989), United States Navy admiral
Michael Johnston (disambiguation), several people
Naazmi Johnston (born 1988), Australian Olympic gymnast
 Nannette Johnston (born 1782), British actress
Ollie Johnston, American pioneer of motion picture animation
Patrick Johnston (medieval courtier), producer of plays, probable lost 15th-century Scottish poet
Reginald Johnston, Scottish teacher of Pu Yi, the last Emperor of China
Richard F. Johnston, American ornithologist, academic and author
Rita Johnston, Canadian politician
Robert Johnston (disambiguation), several people
Rod Johnston (born 1974), Scottish radio presenter
Roger Johnston (1930–2020), Australian politician
Roger Johnston (musician) (?–2004), American drummer and founding member of the rock bank The Monks
Ron Johnston, New Zealand speedway rider
Ron J. Johnston, British geographer
Ross Johnston, Canadian ice hockey player
Samuel Johnston (disambiguation), several people, including
Samuel Johnston, governor of North Carolina and Continental Congress delegate
Sam Johnston (wrestler), American professional wrestler
Sarah Johnston (born 1982), birth name of Australian politician Sarah Mitchell
Sex W. Johnston, pseudonym of Irish poet John W. Sexton
Stiven De Johnston, 14th-century founder of the Scottish Hilton Clan
Sue Johnston, English actress
Suzanne Johnston (born 1958), Australian operatic mezzo-soprano
Tarik "Rvssian" Johnston, Jamaican music producer
Teri Johnston, American politician and first openly lesbian woman to be elected as a Florida mayor
Terry D. Johnston (born 1947), American politician and businesswoman
Tom Johnston (disambiguation)
Trent Johnston (born 1974), Irish cricketer
Willie Johnston, Scottish footballer
Zoë Johnston, British singer-songwriter

See also 
 Johnstone (surname)
 Johnston McCulley (1883–1958), American writer best known as the creator of Zorro
 Clan Johnstone, a Scottish clan
 Johnson

English-language surnames
Scottish surnames